Charles Lewis Slattery (December 9, 1867 – March 12, 1930) was a bishop of the Episcopal Diocese of Massachusetts and a prominent writer in the early twentieth century.

Biography
He was born in Pittsburgh, Pennsylvania to the Reverend George Sidney Leffingwell and Emma McClellan Slattery. Slattery was educated at Harvard University (1887-1891) and the former Episcopal Theological School (1891-1894) at Cambridge, Massachusetts. He was ordained to the diaconate in 1894 and to the priesthood in 1895. He served as dean of the Cathedral of Our Merciful Saviour in Faribault, Minnesota from 1896-1907; rector of Christ Church, Springfield, Massachusetts (1907-1910); and rector of Grace Church, New York (1910-1922).

Slattery was Bishop Coadjutor of the Episcopal Diocese of Massachusetts from 1922 to 1927, and diocesan bishop from 1927-1930. A prolific author, he received honorary doctoral degrees from the Episcopal Theological School, the University of the South at Sewanee, Trinity College, Hartford, and Harvard University.

References

External links
 Bibliographic directory from Project Canterbury

1867 births
1930 deaths
Harvard Divinity School alumni
Episcopal bishops of Massachusetts
20th-century Anglican bishops in the United States
Burials at Mount Auburn Cemetery
Religious leaders from Pittsburgh